The NWF Heavyweight Championship was a professional wrestling World championship used as part of the National Wrestling Federation and later New Japan Pro-Wrestling.

History 
The NWF (National Wrestling Federation) Heavyweight Championship was created by wrestling promoter Pedro Martinez for his NWF promotion in New York in 1970. The title was mainly defended in the New York/Eastern Canada area, until then-champion Johnny Powers took the belt with him on a tour of Japan with Tokyo Pro Wrestling. Powers would eventually lose the title to Antonio Inoki, who would take the belt with him when he founded New Japan Pro-Wrestling.

Inoki became the wrestler most associated with the title due to his high-profile defenses of the title, defeating the likes of Stan Hansen, André the Giant, Tiger Jeet Singh, and Ernie Ladd while champion. Recognized as a four-time NWF Heavyweight champion, between the years of 1973 and 1983, Inoki was champion for all but six months. Inoki's fourth reign was actually due to the decision to hold up the championship, following a defense against Stan Hansen on April 17, 1981 that ended in a no contest. Inoki later regained the title on April 23, 1981 by defeating Hansen in a rematch. He retired the NWF title immediately after the match due to his desire to enter the 1983 IWGP League.

Then as part of a NJPW storyline, the NWF Heavyweight championship was revived in August 2002. Mixed martial arts fighter Kazuyuki Fujita held a tournament to crown a new champion to rival the IWGP Heavyweight Championship. The tournament participants were announced to be wrestlers with a background in MMA, including Fujita, Yoshihiro Takayama, Tsuyoshi Kosaka, and Tadao Yasuda. Takayama won the tournament on January 4, 2003, beating Kosaka with a knee kick in the finals to become the first revived champion in over two decades. Takayama later lost the NWF Championship to Shinsuke Nakamura exactly a year later to unify the NWF and IWGP titles. Nakamura formally announced his vacating of the NWF Heavyweight title on January 5, 2004, retiring the belt for a second time during its history.

The title history was viewable on NJPW website until removed for unknown reasons.

Reigns

Original version

Revived version

Notes

See also
NWA Worlds Heavyweight Championship
PWF Heavyweight Championship
IWA World Heavyweight Championship
World Heavyweight Championship (UWF International)

References

External links
NWF Heavyweight title history
NWF Heavyweight Championship
Strong Style Spirit
Official title history (revived version)

Heavyweight wrestling championships
National Wrestling Federation championships
New Japan Pro-Wrestling championships